Tommy Lee Hart (born November 7, 1944) is a former American football defensive end in the National Football League (NFL) for the San Francisco 49ers, Chicago Bears and New Orleans Saints. He played college football Morris Brown College.

Early years
Hart attended Ballard High School. He accepted a football scholarship from Morris Brown College. He earned four letters in football as an offensive guard, offensive tackle and defensive tackle. He also earned three letters in track as a sprinter and shot putter.

He was a three-time All-conference selection. He was named second-team NAIA All-American as a senior. In 1993, he was inducted into the State of Georgia Sports Hall of Fame.

Professional career
Hart was selected by the San Francisco 49ers in the tenth round (261st overall) of the 1968 NFL Draft. 

He was a one-time Pro Bowler in 1976 when he recorded 16 sacks including 6 in a single-game versus the Los Angeles Rams. He recorded 17 sacks in 1972 when he was honorable-mention All-NFC. In 1972 and 1976, he earned the Len Eshmont Award, the 49ers most prestigious annual honor. He was traded to the Chicago Bears before the start of the 1978 season.

Personal life
In 1981, he was hired as an assistant defensive line coach for the 49ers under head coach Bill Walsh. He was a part of three Super Bowl championship teams. His 1985 coached defensive line, helped the team collect 60 sacks, the second highest total in team history. He moved to the 49ers scouting department from 1992 to 1993.

In 1996, he joined the Dallas Cowboys as the defensive ends coach. In 1998, he was hired as the Cowboys West area scout.

References

1944 births
Living people
American football defensive ends
Chicago Bears players
Dallas Cowboys scouts
Morris Brown Wolverines football players
New Orleans Saints players
San Francisco 49ers coaches
San Francisco 49ers players
San Francisco 49ers scouts
National Conference Pro Bowl players
Sportspeople from Macon, Georgia
Players of American football from Georgia (U.S. state)